Kathy Sledge (born January 6, 1959) is an American singer–songwriter and producer. Sledge is best known as the youngest and founding member of Sister Sledge, an American vocal group which is made up of her sisters that formed in 1971.

After achieving success beginning the late–1970s thru the mid–1980s with Sister Sledge, Sledge embarked on her solo career in 1989. She has had several hits on the International Pop and Hot Dance Music/Club Play chart, including "Take Me Back to Love Again", which hit #1 in 1992.

Biography

Early life and education
Born in Philadelphia, Sledge was the youngest child born to Edwin (1922–1996), a former Broadway star of dance-tap duo 'Fred and Sledge' and Florez (née Williams; 1928–2007). Her siblings are Norma Carol Blackmon, Debra, Joan and Kim Sledge. Sledges' grandmother Viola Williams was a opera singer. For high school, Sledge attended Olney High School; graduating in 1977. After completing high school, Sledge continued her education at Temple University; majoring in Recreational Opportunities for the disabled.

Career
Sledge along with her sisters formed Sister Sledge in 1971. Sledge performed the lead vocals on the two Top 10 US hits the group had on the Hot 100, "He's the Greatest Dancer" and "We Are Family" which were released in 1979. Sledge left the group and embarked on a solo career in 1989. In 1992, Sledge released a solo album, Heart, which peaked at #86 on the R&B charts. The album produced two singles, "Take Me Back to Love Again" (US R&B #24) and "All of My Love" (US R&B #57). Sledge collaborated with dance producer Robert Miles on the dance/pop single "Freedom" 1997. She returned to the dance chart in 2001 as a featured vocalist for King Britt's musical project Sylk 130 on the track "Rising".

In 2011, Sledge released a track called "Give Yourself Up" on Universal Records, featuring Adam Barta, and produced by Mike Rizzo and Mr. Mig, which hit Top 20 on the Billboard Hot Club Play Chart. In September 2013, Sledge was the first signing of the new Pacific Electronic Music record label formed by Jerry L. Greenberg (former President of Atlantic Records), Max Martire & Lenny Ibizarre. On September 25, 2013, Sledge received an "Outstanding Contribution to Music" award  at the 16th DJ Awards at Pacha, Ibiza. and performed the new Aristofreeks remix of "We Are Family". The first release of the five remixes of "We Are Family" that she re-recorded with the Aristofreeks were released on November 11, 2013. Sledge also has a single together with the same group, "Keep It Moving" (2014), which went up to the No. 2 spot on the US Dance chart.

Personal life
Sledge has been married once and has two children. Sledge has been married to musician Philip Lightfoot since 1981 and together they have two children, Kristen (b. 1983) and Phillip Jr. (b. 1985). Kathy's life with her sisters, after their initial fame, was somewhat tumultuous. There is still a genuine love between the sisters. As she describes, "all families butt heads and while we fight, we still love each other."

Discography

Solo Artist

Albums

Singles
As main artist

As a featured artist

Filmography 
 1975, 1977, 1982, 1983, 1992: Soul Train — Herself (5 episodes)
 1979: American Bandstand — Herself (1 episode)
 1982: Fridays — Herself (1 episode)
 1984: The Jeffersons — Kathy Satin (1 episode)
 1992: It's Showtime at the Apollo — Herself (1 episode)
 2000: 100 Greatest Dance Songs of Rock & Roll — Herself
 2006: Archive Footage:Be My Baby: The Girl Group Story — Herself (uncredited)
 2008: Soul Power — Herself with Sister Sledge (uncredited; 1974 concert series from the "Rumble in the Jungle" between Muhammad Ali and George Foreman in Zaire)

See also
List of number-one dance hits (United States)
List of artists who reached number one on the US Dance chart

References

External links

 Kathy Sledge discography, album releases & credits at Discogs

1959 births
Living people
American disco musicians
Musicians from Philadelphia
20th-century African-American women singers
Songwriters from Pennsylvania
Singers from Pennsylvania
African-American songwriters
21st-century African-American people
21st-century African-American women
Sister Sledge members